Paul George Sheerin (born 28 August 1974) is a Scottish former football player and coach. 

Sheerin played as a midfielder for Alloa Athletic, Southampton, Östersunds FK, Inverness Caledonian Thistle, Ayr United, Aberdeen, St Johnstone and Arbroath. 

While continuing as a player, he was appointed manager of Arbroath in May 2010. He held this post until June 2014, when he returned to Aberdeen as a youth team coach. Sheerin became manager of Falkirk in May 2021, but was sacked later that year and moved to Kilmarnock as first team coach.

Playing career
Sheerin signed as a professional for Alloa from junior side Whitehill Welfare, although he had been on the books of Celtic as a schoolboy. Paul Sheerin signed for Southampton in October 1992 and while at The Dell he played under several managers including Ian Branfoot, Alan Ball and Graeme Souness. However, he failed to break through and left in December 1997 without having made a first team appearance. During his time at Southampton he earned international recognition after playing for Scotland Under-21 in a 1–0 win over San Marino in November 1995.

After a summer playing in Sweden with Östersunds FK, he had a brief period back at his former club Alloa before joining Inverness Caledonian Thistle in January 1998. His stint at Caley Thistle lasted to the end of the 2000–01 season, in which period he made 136 appearances, scoring 45 goals. He then had spells at Ayr United and Aberdeen, where he finished as the top scorer in the 2002–03 season. After leaving Aberdeen, Sheerin joined St Johnstone on the eve of the 2004–05 season on a free transfer, signing a two-year contract. On 15 November 2006, Sheerin was awarded the Scottish Football League "Player of the Month" award for October. He scored as St Johnstone won the 2007 Scottish Challenge Cup Final against Dunfermline Athletic. In May 2008, Sheerin had his contract extended with St Johnstone by another year. He coached St Johnstone U17s.

Coaching career
While still playing for the St Johnstone  first team, Sheerin coached their under-17 team that won the SFL Under-17 Youth Division in 2008–09.

Arbroath manager
On 27 May 2010, Sheerin was confirmed as the new player/manager of Arbroath. Sheerin guided Arbroath to the Third Division championship in his first season in charge, the club's first national trophy win in their 133-year history. He agreed a new contract with Arbroath at the end of the 2010–11 season. Arbroath were relegated after finishing last in the 2013–14 Scottish League One.

Aberdeen
After the end of the season, Sheerin left Arbroath and became the manager of Aberdeen's under-20 team. Aberdeen won the Development League title in his first season in 2014–15. The under-20 team also reached the Scottish Youth Cup final in 2017–18, but lost 3–1 to Hibernian.

Following the departure of Derek McInnes on 8 March 2021, Sheerin was appointed interim manager at Aberdeen. Sheerin took charge of one game, a 1–0 defeat against Dundee United, before the club appointed Stephen Glass as the new manager.

Falkirk manager
On 28 May 2021, Sheerin was named as the new head coach of Scottish League One side Falkirk. He was sacked by Falkirk after a 6–0 defeat by Queen's Park that left them in fifth place, three points outside of the promotion play-off positions. Soon after leaving Falkirk, Sheerin took up a coaching position with Derek McInnes at Kilmarnock in January 2022.

Managerial statistics

Honours

Player
St Johnstone
 Scottish First Division: 2008–09
 Scottish Challenge Cup: 2007–08

Arbroath
 Scottish Third Division: 2010–11

Manager
St Johnstone U-17
SFL Under-17 Youth Division: 2008–09

Arbroath
 Scottish Third Division: 2010–11

Aberdeen U-20
 SPFL Development League: 2014–15

References

External links

St Johnstone's official site profile
Scotland U21 stats at Fitbastats

Living people
1974 births
Scottish footballers
Footballers from Edinburgh
Association football midfielders
Scotland under-21 international footballers
Scottish Professional Football League players
Scottish Football League players
Celtic F.C. players
Alloa Athletic F.C. players
Southampton F.C. players
Östersunds FK players
Inverness Caledonian Thistle F.C. players
Ayr United F.C. players
Aberdeen F.C. players
St Johnstone F.C. players
Arbroath F.C. players
Scottish football managers
Scottish Premier League players
Scottish Professional Football League managers
Scottish Football League managers
Arbroath F.C. managers
Aberdeen F.C. non-playing staff
Falkirk F.C. managers
Kilmarnock F.C. non-playing staff
Scottish expatriate footballers
Scottish expatriate sportspeople in Sweden
Expatriate footballers in Sweden